Roy Lee Hawes (July 5, 1926 – October 9, 2017) was an American baseball player who had a 14-year professional career.

Hawes' MLB service came at the tail end of the 1951 campaign. In his debut, at Shibe Park on September 23, he was sent to the plate in the third inning as a pinch hitter for Connie Marrero and singled off Bob Hooper of the Philadelphia Athletics. He was then erased on a double play. Washington trailed 6–0 at the time, and lost the contest, 12–4. He appeared in two more games, including one start at first base on September 30, and went hitless in his next five at bats. Hawes played over 1,700 games during his minor-league career, which included six full seasons for the Double-A Chattanooga Lookouts. He retired after the 1960 season. Hawes died at the age of 91 on October 9, 2017 in Ringgold, Georgia.

References

External links

1926 births
2017 deaths
Atlanta Crackers players
Austin Senators players
Baseball players from Illinois
Charleston Senators players
Chattanooga Lookouts players
Louisville Colonels (minor league) players
Major League Baseball first basemen
Miami Marlins (IL) players
Pauls Valley Raiders players
People from St. Clair County, Illinois
St. Paul Saints (AA) players
Sherman–Denison Twins players
Vincennes Citizens players
Washington Senators (1901–1960) players
Wichita Braves players
Marion Indians players